Cathedral of the Blessed Sacrament may refer to:   

 Cathedral of the Blessed Sacrament, Christchurch, New Zealand
 Cathedral of the Blessed Sacrament (Sacramento, California)
 Cathedral of the Most Blessed Sacrament in Detroit, Michigan
 Cathedral of the Blessed Sacrament (Altoona, Pennsylvania)
 Cathedral of the Blessed Sacrament (Greensburg, Pennsylvania)

See also
Blessed Sacrament Church (disambiguation)